Stênio Garcia Dutra (born 29 June 1994), commonly known as Stênio, is a Brazilian footballer who plays as a forward for Nova Venécia.

Club career
Stênio signed for Campeonato Carioca Série B1 side Itaboraí in August 2016, but left the next year for Série D side Portuguesa.

After 6 appearances and 1 goal in the 2017 Campeonato Carioca, Stênio signed for Finnish side FC Lahti in March 2017.

Career statistics

Club

Notes

References

External links
 

1995 births
Living people
Brazilian footballers
Brazilian expatriate footballers
Association football forwards
Esporte Clube Democrata players
Associação Desportiva Itaboraí players
Associação Atlética Portuguesa (RJ) players
FC Lahti players
KF Laçi players
Veikkausliiga players
Campeonato Brasileiro Série C players
Kategoria Superiore players
Brazilian expatriate sportspeople in Finland
Brazilian expatriate sportspeople in Albania
Expatriate footballers in Finland
Expatriate footballers in Albania